
Year 601 (DCI) was a common year starting on Sunday (link will display the full calendar) of the Julian calendar. The denomination 601 for this year has been used since the early medieval period, when the Anno Domini calendar era became the prevalent method in Europe for naming years.

Events 
 By place 
 Byzantine Empire 
 Balkan Campaign: A Byzantine army under command of Peter, brother of Emperor Maurice, crosses the Danube and advances to the Tisza River, where it defeats the Avars.

 Europe 
 The Franks, Merovingians and Carolingians successively control most of Europe, while strong feudal lords rise in power to gain the allegiance of the people.
 The Lombards under King Agilulf expand into Northern Italy, establishing a settlement with the Franks and maintaining intermittent relationships with Rome.
 Liuva II, age 18, succeeds his father Reccared I as king of the Visigoths. Reccared dies a natural death at the capital in Toledo after a 15-year reign.

 By topic 

 Arts and sciences 
 The Qieyun, a Chinese character rhyme dictionary, is published.

 Agriculture 
 Food production increases in northern and Western Europe as a result of agricultural technology introduced by the Slavs, who employ a lightweight plow with a knife blade (coulter), that cuts deep into the soil at grassroots level, together with a shaped board, or "moldboard", that moves the cut soil to one side.

 Religion 
 The future Archbishops of Canterbury (Mellitus, Justus, and Honorius), and the future Archbishop of York Paulinus, are sent to England by Pope Gregory I to aid Augustine in his missionary work. Gregory writes the decretal Libellus responsionum to Augustine.

Births 
 September 13 – Ali, central figure in Shia Islam (d. 661)
 Hongren, Chán (Buddhist) patriarch of the Tang Dynasty (d. 674)
 Ma Zhou, chancellor of the Tang Dynasty (d. 648)
 Sigebert II, king of Austrasia and Burgundy (d. 613)
 Zhangsun, empress of the Tang Dynasty (d. 636)

Deaths 
 March 13 or 600 – Leander, bishop of Seville  
 Agilulf, bishop of Metz
 Reccared I, king of the Visigoths (b. 559)
 Bertha of Kent, Frankish-born Anglo-Saxon queen consort, canonized (b. c.565) (approximate date)
 Sophia, Byzantine Empress consort (approximate date)

References